Clyde Harris (24 November 1905 – 2 June 1981) was a New Zealand cricket umpire. He stood in four Test matches between 1952 and 1956. In all, he umpired 23 first-class matches between 1944 and 1958, all of them at Eden Park, Auckland.

Harris married Ella Joyce Wigmore in Auckland in January 1931. He worked as a schoolteacher.

See also
 List of Test cricket umpires

References

1905 births
1981 deaths
Sportspeople from Auckland
New Zealand Test cricket umpires